The OMX Stockholm 30 (OMXS30) is a stock market index for the Stockholm Stock Exchange. It is a capitalization-weighted index of the 30 most-traded stock on the Nasdaq Stockholm stock exchange. The index started on 30 Sep 1986 with a base value of 125.

Index composition

2021-11-01

Contract Specifications 
The OMX Stockholm Index trades on the NASDAQ Nordic Derivatives exchange (OMXFUT). the contract specifications are shown below:

Annual returns 

The following table shows the annual development of the OMX Stockholm 30 since 1986.

Footnotes

External links
Official Nasdaq Nordic list of OMXS30 components
 Bloomberg page for OMX:IND

Nasdaq Nordic
Swedish stock market indices